Fluoroberyllate is an anion of fluorine and beryllium and compounds containing it with other elements.  The main kinds are the tetrafluoroberyllates (BeF4)2−, the trifluoroberyllates (BeF3)−, polymeric fluoroberyllates (which can crystalize similar to silica containing minerals) and fluoroberyllate glass.

References

Fluoro complexes
Beryllium compounds
Fluorometallates